Sergei Vladimirovich Ursuliak (born 10 June 10 1958) is a Russian filmmaker, screenwriter, actor, and TV presenter. He is known for the films Composition for Victory Day (1996) and Long Farewell (2004), and the TV series Liquidation. He has won several awards, including Nika Awards and the State Prize of the Russian Federation.

Early life and education
Ursuliak was born on 10 June 10 1958 in Petropavlovsk-Kamchatsky, Russia.

He studied at the Gerasimov Institute of Cinematography.

Career
He is a filmmaker, screenwriter and actor, and also presents programs on television.

Awards
 1996: Kinotavr — Panorama prize for work by established directors
  Prize of Russian Guild of Film Critics
 2008, 2012: Nika Awards
 2015: Award of the Government of Russian Federation in the field of culture
 2016:  State Prize of the Russian Federation

Filmography

As director
 Russian Ragtime   (1993)
 Summerfolk   (1995)
  Notes from the Dead House (1997) 
 Composition for Victory Day   (1998)
 Failure Poirot (2002)  
 Long Farewell   (2004)
 Liquidation (TV series, 2007)
 Isayev (2008)
 Konstantin Raikin. One on One with the Audience (2012, documentary)
 Life and Fate   (2012)
 And Quiet Flows the Don (2015)
 The Diamond Chariot (2021)
  (2023)

Personal life 
Ursuliak has been married twice and has two daughters: 
 First wife  — actress Galina Nadirli 
Daughter  — actress Alexandra Ursuliak  
  Second wife  — actress Lika Nifontova  
Daughter  — actress Darya Ursuliak

References

External links 
 
  Биография Сергея Урсуляка (in Russian)
 Пестрая лента с Урсуляком (Video, in Russian)

1958 births
Living people
People from Petropavlovsk-Kamchatsky
Soviet film directors
Russian film directors
High Courses for Scriptwriters and Film Directors alumni
Academicians of the Russian Academy of Cinema Arts and Sciences "Nika"
State Prize of the Russian Federation laureates
Russian television presenters
20th-century Russian screenwriters
Male screenwriters
20th-century Russian male writers
Soviet screenwriters